Augusto Alberici (born September 1846, Trastavere, Rome) was an Italian painter and antiquarian.

He was born in Rome, but his father was a sea captain from Gaeta. His mother was Roman. He trained under Toglietti in Accademia di San Luca. he obtained the early sponsorship of two patrons, the engineer Giovanni Battista Marotti and Giovanni Frontini. He mainly painted battle vistas or landscapes. Among his works were:
The Snow
Anticoli
The return from the Campaign
The battle of Crescentino fought by Emanuele Filiberto
Julius Caesar crosses the Rubicon

References

Painters from Rome
19th-century Italian painters
Italian male painters
1846 births
1922 deaths
19th-century Italian male artists